Coreocarpus is a genus of flowering plants in the family Asteraceae native to northwestern Mexico and southern Arizona.

 Species
 Coreocarpus arizonicus (A.Gray) S.F.Blake  Arizona (Pima, Santa Cruz, Cochise Counties), Sonora, Sinaloa, Chihuahua, Baja California Sur
 Coreocarpus congregatus (S.F.Blake) E.B.Sm.  - Sinaloa
 Coreocarpus dissectus (Benth.) S.F.Blake  - Baja California Sur
 Coreocarpus ixtapanus B.L.Turner - México State
 Coreocarpus parthenioides Benth.  - Baja California Sur
 Coreocarpus sonoranus Sherff - Sonora

References

Coreopsideae
Asteraceae genera
Flora of North America